Maximiliano Jorge Giusti (18 February 1991 – 8 October 2016) was an Argentine football centre forward. At the time of his death, he played for Mushuc Runa in the Ecuadorian Serie A.

Career
Giusti debuted in the Argentine Primera División playing for Vélez Sársfield on a 6–34 defeat to All Boys for the second fixture of the 2011 Clausura. He had already played however in the team's 2011 Copa Libertadores debut, 3–0 over Caracas FC, when he entered the field to replace injured Guillermo Franco. On his first season with the first team, he helped Vélez to win the Argentine championship playing 5 games, and also played 3 in the team's Copa Libertadores semi-finalist campaign.

For the start of the 2011–12 season, Giusti was loaned to Audax Italiano of the Chilean Primera División.

Honours
Vélez Sársfield
Argentine Primera División (1): 2011 Clausura

References

 Mushuc Runa oficializa la contratación de 2 extranjeros, estadio.ec, 7 January 2016

External links
  
 
 
 

1991 births
2016 deaths
Argentine footballers
Argentine expatriate footballers
Club Atlético Vélez Sarsfield footballers
Audax Italiano footballers
Club Deportivo Universidad de San Martín de Porres players
CS Pandurii Târgu Jiu players
Argentine Primera División players
Chilean Primera División players
Peruvian Primera División players
Liga I players
Expatriate footballers in Chile
Expatriate footballers in Peru
Expatriate footballers in Romania
Association football forwards
Road incident deaths in Argentina
Argentine expatriate sportspeople in Chile
Argentine expatriate sportspeople in Peru
Argentine expatriate sportspeople in Romania
People from San Nicolás de los Arroyos
Sportspeople from Buenos Aires Province